Mary Long may refer to:
Mary Beth Long, businesswoman and former U.S. government official
Mary Elitch Long (1856–1936), one of the original owners of Elitch Gardens in Denver, Colorado
Mary "Polly" Long, first wife of Tobias Lear V
"Mary Long", a song by Deep Purple from their 1973 album Who Do We Think We Are

Long, Mary